Hoseynabad-e Qoroq (also Romanized as Ḩoseynābād-e Qoroq; also known as Ḩoseynābād) is a village in Ramjerd-e Do Rural District, Dorudzan District, Marvdasht County, Fars Province, Iran. At the 2006 census, its population was 137, in 41 families.

References 

Populated places in Marvdasht County